Magic Juan (born July,27 1971) is an American merengue hip hop artist of Dominican parentage. He was born in Washington Heights, Manhattan, New York City and raised in Teaneck, New Jersey.

Background
At the age of ten he joined the school choir and started taking piano, guitar, and drum lessons outside of school. His parents were skeptical about whether or not he would stick with music, but after Juan had won some talent contests they were convinced he was serious. To keep him off the streets, his parents bought him some recording equipment, and Juan spent his days after school writing songs, rapping, recording, and sampling. After high school he played with the idea of studying marketing, but an offer to join Proyecto Uno, a merengue band with heavy urban and hip-hop influences, he decided to leave college (NYIT) in favor for pursuing his interest in music. His bilingual rapping was featured on the cut "Brinca," a single that went to number one in over eight countries in Latin America. Proyecto Uno went on to sell over three million albums worldwide. Juan soon desired to record his own solo material. In 2003, he released his solo debut, La Prueba, and became the New York correspondent for Telemundo's Latin hip-hop show, The Roof.

In 2004, he released Libertad: The Magic Juan Mix and the double CD, Inevitable. On June 9, 2009, Magic released his third studio album as a solo artist, The Sure Bet, containing a wide variety of musical influences including hip hop, reggae, bachata, salsa, and merengue. The album's first single was "Baby Come Back".

Solo albums
Hokus Pokus : Give Me The World (1991)
Flia: The Album (2000)
La Prueba (2003)
El Duro (2004)
Libertad: The Magic Juan Street Mix Jump Off (2004)
Inevitable (2004)
Quiscalle (2007)
The Sure Bet (2009)

References

Record producers from New York (state)
People from Teaneck, New Jersey
People from Washington Heights, Manhattan
American reggaeton musicians
American merengue musicians
American hip hop musicians
American rappers of Dominican Republic descent
Living people
1971 births
21st-century American rappers